Ready to Roll is the eighth album by Thelma Houston, released in 1978 on Motown Records. It was a modest success, peaking only at #74 in the US R&B charts. The single "Saturday Night, Sunday Morning" gained momentum in 1979 and was included in a remixed version on Houston's Ride to the Rainbow album in 1979.
The album was released on CD in 2018 by Soulmusic Records, in a compilation that also includes The Devil in Me, Ride to the Rainbow and Reachin' All Around.

Track listing 
 "Saturday Night, Sunday Morning" (Mitchell Botler, Norma Helms)
 "Love Is Comin' On" (Greg Wright, Karin Patterson, Ronnie Vann)
 "I Wanna Start My Life All Over Again" (Sandra Crouch, Sharon Anton)
 "Midnight Mona" (Greg Wright, Kain Patterson, Ronnie Vann)
 "Pardon Me" (Alfred McCrary, Sundray Tucker)
 "Everybody's Got a Story" (Sandra Crouch, Sharon Anton)
 "Strange" (Greg Wright, Karin Patterson, Olivia Foster)
 "Am I Expecting Too Much" (Curtis Anthony Nolen, Dana Meyers, Maureen Bailey, Raymond Crossley)
 "Can't We Try" (Ken Hirsch, Ronald Miller)

Personnel 
 Thelma Houston - lead vocals
 Rock Deadrick - percussion
 James Gadson - drums
 Greg Wright - keyboards, backing vocals
 Ray Parker Jr. - guitar
 Greg Phillinganes - keyboards
 Eddie N. Watkins Jr. - bass guitar
 Gary Coleman - percussion
 Sonny Burke - keyboards
 Roland Bautista - guitar
 Robert Lee Hill - bass guitar
 Gene Estes - vibraphone
 Alan Estes - percussion
 Alan Oldfield - keyboards
 Wah Wah Watson - guitar
 Eddie "Bongo" Brown - percussion
 John Barnes - keyboards
 Tony Newton - bass guitar
 Ronnie Vann - guitar
 Clarence McDonald - keyboards
 Ivory Davis - backing vocals
 Maxi Anderson - backing vocals
 Julia Tillman Waters - backing vocals
 Maxine Waters - backing vocals
 Oren Waters - backing vocals
 Roger St. Kenerly - backing vocals
 Pattie Brooks - backing vocals
 Platypus - backing vocals
 Olivia Foster - backing vocals
 Karin Patterson - backing vocals
 Stephanie Spruill - backing vocals
 Venetta Fields - backing vocals
 Dorothy Sheffield - backing vocals
Arthur G. Wright, David Blumberg, Jimmie Haskell - string and horn arrangements

References

1978 albums
Thelma Houston albums
Albums arranged by Jimmie Haskell
Albums produced by Hal Davis
Motown albums